This is a list of drama films of the 1920s.

1920

 The $1,000,000 Reward 
 Within Our Gates

1921

 Four Horsemen of the Apocalypse
 The Kid
 The Sheik

1922

 Oliver Twist

1923

 Ashes of Vengeance
 Merry-Go-Round
 White Rose
 A Woman of Paris

1924

 Dante's Inferno
 Die Nibelungen
 The Enchanted Cottage
 Greed
 Janice Meredith
 The Last Laugh
 The Saga of Gosta Berling
 Strike
 Tess of the d'Urbervilles

1925

 Battleship Potemkin
 The Big Parade
 Die freudlose Gasse
 The Gold Rush
 Variété

1926

 The General
 Faust
 Metropolis
 Mother
 A Page of Madness
 Sparrows
 Tartuffe
 Torrent

1927

 The End of St. Petersburg
 The Fake
 The Jazz Singer
 The King of Kings
 Love of Jeanne Ney
 Madame Pompadour
 Seventh Heaven
 Sunrise: A Song of Two Humans
 The Way of All Flesh

1928

 4 Devils
 The Crowd
 The Last Command
 Lonesome
 The Man Who Laughs
 Oktyabr
 The Passion of Joan of Arc
 The Patriot
 S.O.S.
 Steamboat Bill, Jr.
 Storm Over Asia
 The Trail of '98
 Thérèse Raquin
 The Wedding March
 The Wind
 Zvenigora

1929

 Arsenal
 Diary of a Lost Girl
 Disraeli
 Pandora's Box
 Valiant

References

Drama
1920s